Fouqué is a surname. Notable people with the surname include:

Heinrich August de la Motte Fouqué (1698–1774), Prussian general
Friedrich de la Motte Fouqué (1777–1843), Prussian writer
Ferdinand André Fouqué (1828–1904), French geologist and petrologist